And Blood Was Shed in Warsaw is the third live performance recording by Polish death metal band Vader.  It was released on 8 October 2007 by Metal Mind.

And Blood Was Shed in Warsaw features footage from the bands concert at Stodola Club in February 2007. The show was filmed with 7 cameras. The DVD also include: fully animated menu, band biography, discography, interview with Piotr "Peter" Wiwczarek, video clips "Sword of the Witcher", and "Helleluyah!!! (God Is Dead)", desktop images, photo gallery, and weblinks.

Track listing

Personnel 
Production and performance credits are adapted from the album liner notes.

 Vader
 Piotr "Peter" Wiwczarek – rhythm guitar, lead guitar, lead vocals
 Maurycy "Mauser" Stefanowicz – rhythm guitar, lead guitar
 Marcin "Novy" Nowak – bass guitar
 Dariusz "Daray" Brzozowski – drums
 Additional musicians
 Tomasz "Orion" Wróblewski – lead vocals

 Note
 Filmed and recorded at Stodoła Club, Warsaw, 12 February 2007

 Production
 Lucjan Siwczyk – lighting
 Adam Sieklicki – photos
 Marta Tłuszcz – photos
 Piotr Brzeziński – sound recording, mixing
 Jarosław Kaszyński – sound technician
 Grzegorz Kupiec – vision mix
 Marcelo HVC – art work
 Jarosław Wieczorek – translation and subtitles
 Massive Music – management
 Artur Wojewoda – vision editing
 Waldemar Szwajda – vision editing
 Tomasz Dziubiński – executive producer
 Darek Świtała – interview editing & filming
 Piotr Godzina – interview editing & filming

References 

Concert films
Vader (band) albums
2007 live albums
2007 video albums
Live video albums
Metal Mind Productions video albums
Polish-language live albums